La Cruz Hill, or its Spanish translation Cerro La Cruz or Cerro de la Cruz (transliterated as Hill of the Cross) may refer to:

 La Cruz Hill (Pichilemu), a hill in Pichilemu, O'Higgins Region, Chile;
 La Cruz Hill (Santiago de Chile), a hill in Santiago de Chile, Santiago Metropolitan Region, Chile;
 La Cruz Hill (Quintero), a hill in Quintero, Valparaíso Region, Chile;
 Cerro de la Cruz (Tepic), a hill in Tepic, Nayarit, Mexico;
 Cerro de la Cruz (Chontla), a hill in Chontla, Veracruz, Mexico;
 the Iberian village of Cerro de la Cruz, an archaeological site in Almedinilla, Córdoba Province, Spain.
 La Cruz Hill Protected Zone, a protected area in Costa Rica surrounding the eponymous hill.